The Atruaghin Clans (product code GAZ14) is an accessory for the Dungeons & Dragons fantasy role-playing game. The book was written by William W. Connors, and was published in 1991. Cover art is by Clyde Caldwell, with interior illustrations by Stephen Fabian.

Contents
The book describes the territory of the Known World/Mystara known as "the Atruaghin Clans", which are a society loosely based on American Indian tribes.

The publication consists of two booklets, a fold-out map and a cardboard cover. The 64-page booklet "Player's Guide" describes the realm of the Atruaghin Clans within the D&D world for the players. After the introduction, the book is divided into the following sections: The Story of Atruaghin, Character Generation, Shamani, Spell Descriptions and sections on the individual tribes (Children of the Horse, Children of the Bear, Children of the Turtle, Children of the Tiger, Children of the Elk). The second 32-page booklet ("Referee's Guide") is for the DM. It contains information on the history timeline, the Immortals ("Gods") involved in the Clans' history, some Non Player Characters, sections on "Totem Magic", on "Atruaghin's Mystical Conveyor" and a note on how to adapt the content to 2nd Edition AD&D.

Publication history
GAZ14 The Atruaghin Clans was written by William W. Connors, with a cover by Clyde Caldwell and interior illustrations by Stephen Fabian, and was published by TSR in 1991 as a 64-page booklet, a 32-page booklet with a large color map and an outer folder. It is the last of the Gazeteer series of source books.

Reception

References

Dungeons & Dragons Gazetteers
Mystara
Role-playing game supplements introduced in 1991